Three Tigers Against Three Tigers is a 1977 comedy film directed by  Sergio Corbucci and Steno. It consists of three segments.

Plot

Cast 

 First Segment
 Renato Pozzetto as Don Cimbolano
 Cochi Ponzoni as Father Joe Martini
 Corinne Cléry as The Nanny
 Kirsten Gille as  Diana 
 Massimo Boldi as Romeo  
 Ugo Bologna as  Major Borsetti 
 Ester Carloni as Don Cimbolano's Maid
 Gabriella Giorgelli as The Bartender

 Second Segment
 Enrico Montesano as  Oscar Bertoletti
 Dalila Di Lazzaro as  Countess Lucrezia Marini
 Giuseppe Anatrelli as  Count Rodolfo Peppino Marini di Lampedusa
 Nanni Loy as himself
 Piero Gerlini as The Commissioner 
 Franco Giacobini as  Luigino  
 Gabriella Giorgelli as The Maid

Third Segment
 Paolo Villaggio as Lawyer Scorza
 Anna Mazzamauro as  Giada Nardi
 Daniele Vargas as  Lawyer Berchielli
 Renzo Marignano as  Lorenzo, marito di Giada
 Dino Emanuelli as Lawyer Dal Pino
 Ferruccio Amendola as  Control Tower Officer

See also    
 List of Italian films of 1977

References

External links

Italian comedy films
1977 comedy films
1977 films
Films directed by Sergio Corbucci
Films directed by Stefano Vanzina
Films scored by Guido & Maurizio De Angelis
1970s Italian-language films
1970s Italian films